Boris Dekanidze (13 December 1962 – 12 July 1995) was the head of the Vilnius Brigade criminal organization in Lithuania. In 1994, he was convicted of ordering the murder of Lithuanian journalist Vitas Lingys and was executed by Lithuania. Dekanidze was the last person executed in Lithuania prior to the abolition of capital punishment in 1998.

Biography
Dekanidze was born on 13 December 1962 in Vilnius to Georgian Jewish immigrants. He was a stateless person, not having been granted citizenship in Lithuania or Georgia. In Vilnius, he was the leader of the Vilnius Brigade criminal organization. The Vilnius Brigade mostly consisted of Lithuanian-born people of various ethnic backgrounds (mostly Soviet Jews, ethnic Russians, ethnic Poles, and Lithuanians), although Boris Dekanidze as well as his brother were Georgian Jews.

In 1993, after receiving a number of death threats, Vitas Lingys, one of the founders and publishers of the newspaper Respublika, was shot at point-blank range near his home in Vilnius. Dekanidze was arrested and charged with ordering the murder, which police said was a contract killing which was carried out by Igor Akhremov.

In 1994, Dekanidze was convicted of deliberate murder by a three-judge panel. Dakanidze claimed he was innocent, as the evidence against him was primarily the testimony of Igor Akhremov (a former hitman for the Vilnius Brigade), who testified to having carried out the killing on Dekanidze's orders. On 10 November 1994, Dekanidze was sentenced to death and Akhremov was sentenced to life imprisonment. Lithuanian authorities shut down a nuclear power plant after a terrorist threat was made against it the day after the convictions were handed down. Dekanidze appealed the decision to the Supreme Court, but it ruled in February 1995 that there were no grounds for reviewing the death sentence. His appeal for clemency to President Algirdas Brazauskas was also refused.

Dekanidze was executed on 12 July 1995 in Lukiškės Prison by a single pistol shot to the back of his head. The execution has since been criticized at being carried out even as the Lithuanian parliament was debating the abolition of the death penalty.

Dekanidze's execution was the last in Lithuania, and capital punishment was abolished for all crimes in 1998 after the Lithuanian Constitutional Court ruled it unconstitutional.

See also
List of most recent executions by jurisdiction
Capital punishment in Lithuania

References

Further reading
Amnesty International, "Concerns in Europe: May–December 1994", press release, 1995-01-01
Amnesty International, "1996 Annual Report for Lithuania", Amnesty International Annual Report 1996 (New York: Amnesty International)
Dorinda Elliott, "The Godfather Of Vilnius?: Mafia: Lithuania Cracks Down On Organized Crime", Newsweek, 1994-12-05
Hans Göran Franck, Klas Nyman, and William Schabas (2003). The Barbaric Punishment: Abolishing the Death Penalty (Leiden: Martinus Nijhoff Publishers) pp. 107–108

1962 births
1995 deaths
20th-century executions by Lithuania
Lithuanian criminals
Executed Lithuanian people
Executed gangsters
Crime bosses
People convicted of murder by Lithuania
People executed by Lithuania by firearm
People executed for murder
People extradited from Latvia
People extradited to Lithuania
People from Vilnius
Stateless people